Canonicus (c. 1565 – June 4, 1647) was a chief of the Narragansett Indigenous Peoples. He was wary of the colonial settlers, but he ultimately befriended Roger Williams and other settlers.

Biography

Canonicus was born around 1565, but nothing is known of his early life. He was chief of the Narragansett tribe when the Pilgrims landed at Plymouth, and one of the first with whom they had dealings. In the words of historian Benjamin Lossing, he "regarded the advent of the white men with a jealous fear", and he challenged the Plymouth colony in 1622 in front of a force of about 5,000 men. He sent a bundle of arrows in a leather wrap tied with a snake skin to Plymouth governor William Bradford, so Bradford filled the wrap with gunpowder and lead round shot and returned it to Canonicus. This first exposure to explosive powder and metal was met with "superstitious awe," in the words of Lossing:

They were sent from village to village, and excited so much alarm, that the sachem sued for peace, and made a treaty of friendship; which he never violated, notwithstanding, he often received provocations that would have justified him in scattering all compacts to the winds.

The peace that resulted between the Narragansetts and the colonists extended beyond Canonicus's death in 1647.

Roger Williams was driven from Massachusetts Bay Colony and sought refuge with the Narragansett tribe, and Canonicus made him welcome. In 1636, he gave Williams a large tract of land on which to establish Providence Plantations, the nucleus which became the Colony of Rhode Island and Providence Plantations. In 1637, Canonicus was largely responsible for the Narragansetts' decision to side with the colonists during the Pequot War.

Canonicus was initially succeeded by his nephew Miantonomoh, but Miantonomoh was killed in 1643 and Canonicus resumed leadership. He made a formal treaty on April 19, 1644, acknowledging the sovereignty of King Charles. The influence of his counsels lasted for many years after his death, and the Narragansett tribe maintained peaceful relations with the colonists until King Philip's War in 1675. Canonicus's nephew Pessicus (1623-1676) changed his name to Canonicus to honor his uncle. Canonicus's son Mixan (or Mexanno) died in 1657, but Mixan’s wife, Quaiapen, was the last Narragansett leader killed in King Philip's War.

Descendants of note
 Jim Thorpe (1887-1953), James "Jim" Francis Thorpe (baptized as Jacobus Franciscus Thorpe) was an Olympic champion called the "world's greatest athlete"

Legacy 
 Inducted into the Rhode Island Heritage Hall of Fame, 1997
 Four United States Navy ships have been named USS Canonicus.
 Camp Canonicus, an American Baptist camp in Exeter, Rhode Island.
 There is an avenue named after Canonicus in Newport, Rhode Island.
 There is a street named after Canonicus in Tiverton, Rhode Island.
The name of Conanicut Island.
 Portrayed by Michael Greyeyes in the National Geographic Channel's miniseries Saints & Strangers

See also 

 List of early settlers of Rhode Island

Footnotes

External links 
 Dictionary of American Naval Fighting Ships: Canonicus (ship namesake paragraph)

1560s births
1647 deaths
17th-century Native Americans
Native American leaders
Narragansett people
People of colonial Rhode Island